Vardon is a surname. Notable people with the surname include:

Edward Vardon (1866–1937), Australian politician
Harry Vardon (1870–1937), professional golfer
Joseph Vardon (1843–1937), Australian politician
Pearl Vardon (1915–unknown), British broadcaster of Nazi propaganda during World War II